Switzerland sent 21 athletes to the 1978 European Athletics Championships which took place 29 August–3 September 1978 in Prague. Switzerland won two medals at the Championships.

Medalists

References 

Nations at the 1978 European Athletics Championships
Switzerland at the European Athletics Championships
1978 in Switzerland